Viktor Vladimirovich Nemytskii, also written Niemytski, Nemyckiĭ, Niemytzki, Nemytsky, (22 November 1900 Smolensk – 7 August 1967 Sayan Mountains) was a Soviet mathematician who introduced Nemytskii operators and the Nemytskii plane (Moore plane). He was married to Nina Bari, who was also a mathematician.

Works

References

Soviet mathematicians
People from Smolensk
1900 births
1967 deaths
20th-century Russian mathematicians